Queendom is the sixth Korean extended play and  by South Korean girl group Red Velvet. Marketed as the group's sixth "mini album" release, it consists of six tracks, including the lead single of the same name. The EP was released digitally by SM Entertainment on August 16, 2021, and physically on August 17, 2021.

Background and release
On June 9, 2021, SM Entertainment announced that Red Velvet would be making their comeback in August with a new album. From July 26 to August 1, Red Velvet held a promotional event titled "Queens Mystic General Store" through their Instagram account leading up to their seventh debut anniversary and anticipated comeback. The promotional event showcased props used in their previous music videos, and was intended to heighten the anticipation for the announcement of their comeback and release of their promotional schedule. On August 2, it was announced that Red Velvet would be releasing their sixth extended play titled Queendom, containing six tracks. The extended play is marketed by SM Entertainment as the group's sixth "mini album". On August 3, the promotional schedule for their comeback was released, which included concept photos, promotional posters, and a teaser of the upcoming music video for the title track "Queendom". The EP was released digitally on August 16, and physically the following day.

Composition
Queendom consists of six songs and incorporates various genres such as dance-pop, R&B, and soul. The title track "Queendom" was described as a dance-pop song with a "refreshing atmosphere". The B-side track "Pose" was described as an "up-tempo pop dance" song with an "impressive energetic bass line" and "fast-changing drum". "Knock on Wood" was musically described as a "fairytale-like electro-punk" song with lyrics that detail the "hope to get someone to like you" as well as "the act of knocking on wood for good luck". "Better Be" was called a "witty R&B pop" song characterized by Red Velvet's "dreamy vocals and rich harmonies" and lyrically described as "not giving up easily to the person you like". "Pushin' N Pullin" was described as a "medium-tempo pop R&B" song with a "friendly and gentle message" and lyrics that "tell us to trust in the time we spent together with the person who is pushed with anxiety in [a] relationship". "Hello, Sunset" is a "slow-tempo R&B ballad" that "creates a late summer sensibility", characterized by a "subtle drum rhythm, refreshing electric guitar, and dreamy piano performance" and lyrics about a "confession" of being together with loved ones.

Critical reception

Upon its release, Queendom received positive reviews from music critics. On Metacritic, which assigns a normalized score out of 100 to ratings from publications, the album received a mean score of 74 based on 5 reviews, indicating "generally favorable reviews".

Rhian Daly from NME described the EP as "playing it safe; cautiously dipping a toe back in the water rather than making a big splash to signal their return". Joshua Minsoo Kim writing for Pitchfork called the EP "perfectly adequate, but the release itself never reaches the group's former heights" and "doesn't overflow with excellence". He further added that the title track "rarely offers the quintet the chance to flaunt their vocal prowess", feeling it is "too low-key" and "frustratingly one-dimensional" while labelling other songs on the EP "similarly unambitious, but a couple of its other songs at least have everything in order". Overall, he stated the EP "both falters and thrives in simplicity" and gave it a score of 6.7 out of 10.

Ana Clara Ribeiro from PopMatters described the EP as crème brûlée, comparing the dessert's "simplicity and accessibility in its taste" to Red Velvet's music. Overall, she stated the EP "not all songs from Queendom will be most listened by the fans, and it's not because any of these songs are poor" while explaining that we "don't eat dessert because we need basic nutrients for our body" but because we want to "taste something delicious and Queendom tastes delicious". JT Early from Beats Per Minute described the EP as "an all-killer summer project exploring the themes of empowerment, romance and its accompanying obstacles". and stated the EP "ticks all the boxes that fans would want" and has "great replay value".

Year-end lists

Commercial performance
In South Korea, the EP debuted at number 2 on the Gaon Album Chart in the chart issue dated August 15–21, 2021. In the United Kingdom, the EP debuted at number 17 on the UK Digital Albums in the chart issue dated August 20, 2021. In Japan, the EP debuted at number 41 on Billboard Japan Hot Albums in the chart issue dated August 25, 2021. In the United States, the EP debuted at number 16 and 11 on Billboards Heatseekers Albums and World Albums chart, respectively, in the chart issue dated August 28, 2021.

Accolades

Track listing

Personnel 
Credits adapted from the liner notes of the EP.

Musicians

 Red Velvet (Irene, Seulgi, Wendy, Joy, Yeri) – vocals , background vocals 
 Jo Yoon-kyung – Korean lyrics 
 Lee Seu-ran – Korean lyrics 
 Seo Ji-eum – Korean lyrics 
 Kim In-hyeong (Jam Factory) – Korean lyrics 
 Kenzie – Korean lyrics , background vocals 
 Choi Bo-ra (153Joombas) – Korean lyrics 
 minGtion – composition , arrangement , bass , piano , synthesizer 
 Anne Judith Stokke Wik – composition , background vocals 
 Moa "Cazzi Opeia" Carlebecker – composition , arrangement , background vocals 
 Ellen Berg – composition , background vocals 
  – composition , arrangement 
  – composition , arrangement 
 Ylva Dimberg – composition , arrangement , background vocals 
 Moonshine – composition , arrangement 
 Andreas Öberg – composition , arrangement 
 Skylar Mones – composition , arrangement 
 Michele Wylen – composition 
 Mike Daley – composition , arrangement 
 Mitchell Owens – composition , arrangement 
 Nicole Cohen – composition 
 Sam Klempner – composition , arrangement 
 Noémie Legrand – composition 
 Dewain Whitmore Jr. – composition 
Mike Park – drum 

Technical

 minGtion – directing , digital editing 
 Kriz – vocal directing 
 Seo Mi-rae (ButterFly) – vocal directing , Pro Tools operation 
 Kim Yeon-seo – vocal directing 
 Kenzie – directing 
 Chu Dae-gwan – vocal directing 
 Lee Min-kyu – recording , mixing engineer , mixing 
 Noh Min-ji – recording , digital editing , mixing engineer 
 Kwon Yu-jin – recording , digital editing 
 Lee Jeong-bin – recording 
 Kim Chul-soon – recording , mixing 
 Jeong Eui-seok – recording , digital editing , mixing 
 Kang Sun-young – recording 
 Jung Yoo-ra – digital editing 
 Ahn Chang-kyu – digital editing 
 Kang Eun-ji – mixing engineer 
 Namkoong Jin – mixing 
 Lee Ji-hong – mixing

Charts

Weekly charts

Monthly charts

Year-end charts

Certifications and sales

Release history

Notes

References

2021 EPs
Korean-language EPs
Red Velvet (group) EPs
SM Entertainment EPs